Flechal River is a river of Amapá state in north-eastern Brazil.

See also
List of rivers of Amapá

References

Rivers of Amapá